Andrine is a given name. Notable people with the given name include:

Andrine Benjaminsen (born 1995), Norwegian orienteer and ski orienteer
Andrine Flemmen (born 1974), Norwegian alpine skier
Andrine Hegerberg (born 1993), Norwegian footballer
Andrine Sæther (born 1964), Norwegian actress
Andrine Tomter (born 1995), Norwegian footballer